Weslandia is a children's book by Newbery Medal winner Paul Fleischman, with illustrations by Kevin Hawkes. It was published in 1999 by Candlewick Press.

Plot overview
The story follows a protagonist, Wesley. When Wesley, a somewhat eccentric boy with no friends, discovers a mysterious plant magically growing in his parents' backyard, he cultivates the plant over his summer vacation.  The plant, which he names "swist", provides him with a food source, and allows him to build shelter, tools, and even create his own entertainment and inspires Wesley to create his own writing system.  Wesley's resourcefulness and meticulous research eventually allow to him the basis of his own civilization which he names "Weslandia", an eponymous micro-nation in his parents' backyard. His efforts are successful, and instead of being a social outcast, he gains a group of followers made up of his former grade-school tormentors.

Reviews and reception 
The book has been described by Cyndi Giorgis as a satire that emphasizes the protagonists "vivid world and the mundane uniformity of those around him". The art in the book has been described by "splendid" by Shirley Lewis.  This Book was awarded the Silver Honor by Parents' Choice Foundation.  In 2000 it was also listed as the Notable Children's Books award winner.

References

1999 novels
American children's books
Candlewick Press books